Ludwig A. Minelli (born December 5, 1932) is a Swiss lawyer.  He is the founder of Dignitas, an organization that helps permanently ill people to end life in a manner which relieves pain and suffering.  He is also the founder and general secretary of the Swiss Society for the European Convention on Human Rights.

Minelli is among the majority of supporters of physician-assisted suicide who believe that it should be available to both healthy and sick individuals.

Minelli holds an LL.M. from Zurich University.

Selected works

See also
 Dignitas
 Euthanasia
 Betty and George Coumbias

References

1932 births
Living people
20th-century Swiss lawyers
Swiss activists
Euthanasia activists